Emilio Leciguyena (19 August 1903 – 6 September 1936) was a Spanish alcalde and supporter of the Second Spanish Republic during the Spanish Civil War. He was executed by the Nationalist supporters of Francisco Franco during the White Terror (Spain).

References

1903 births
1936 deaths
Alcaldes of the Second Spanish Republic
Victims of the White Terror (Spain)
People from La Rioja